Scrobipalpa kasyi is a moth in the family Gelechiidae. It was described by Povolný in 1966. It is found in Slovenia, Bulgaria, North Macedonia and Greece.

The forewings are ochreous-brownish with large fields of grey-blackish scales. The hindwings are ashy-greyish.

The larvae feed on Alyssum montanum.

References

Scrobipalpa
Moths described in 1966